Claudia Pulchra (14 BCAD 26) (PIR2 C 1116) was a Patrician woman of Ancient Rome who lived during the reigns of the Roman emperors Augustus and Tiberius.

Biography

Early life
She was a daughter of Claudia Marcella Minor and the Roman consul of 12 BC, Marcus Valerius Messalla Appianus. Her maternal grandmother was Octavia the Younger, sister of Augustus. There has been some speculation among historians such as George Patrick Goold that her father might actually have been Publius Claudius Pulcher (the son of Clodius) but others such as Ronald Syme have rejected this proposal.

Marriage
She became the third wife of the Roman general and politician Publius Quinctilius Varus. Pulchra bore Varus a son, also named Publius Quinctilius Varus. Her husband committed suicide in September AD 9 during the Battle of the Teutoburg Forest, Germania Inferior and she never remarried.

Later life
Pulchra was always a close friend to her second cousin Agrippina the Elder. Through her friendship with Agrippina, Pulchra became the victim of the intrigues associated with the treason trial of Sejanus in AD 26. Gnaeus Domitius Afer accused her of an attempt to poison Tiberius, casting magic and immorality. She died in exile. The Roman historian Tacitus considered the trial to be an indirect political attack against Agrippina.

Her son became wealthy through the inheritance of both his parents. In 27, the younger Varus found himself facing accusations of treason and was nearly condemned. His trial has been attributed to the increasing distrust of Tiberius and the machinations of Sejanus.

See also
 Women in ancient Rome

References

Bibliography
 J. R. Abdale, Four days in September: The Battle of Teutoburg (Google eBook), Trafford Publishing, 2013
 M. Lightman & B. Lightman, A to Z of Ancient Greek and Roman Women, Infobase Publishing, 2008
 A. Barrett, Agrippina: Sex, Power, and Politics in the Early Empire, Yale University Press, 1998

10s BC births
26 deaths
1st-century BC Roman women
1st-century BC Romans
1st-century Roman women
Claudii Pulchri